Cedar Pond is an  lake in Coos County, northern New Hampshire, United States, in the town of Milan. The lake is located just south of Route 110A and west of Route 110B.

On the north side of the lake is a camping area called Cedar Pond Campground.

The lake is classified as a coldwater fishery, with observed species including rainbow trout, largemouth bass, smallmouth bass, chain pickerel, and horned pout.

See also

List of lakes in New Hampshire

References

External links
Cedar Pond Camping

Lakes of Coös County, New Hampshire